Tahvanainen is a Finnish surname. Notable people with the surname include:

 Keijo Tahvanainen, Finnish weightlifter
 Veijo Tahvanainen (born 1938), Finnish orienteering competitor
 Timo Tahvanainen (born 1986), Finnish footballer

Finnish-language surnames